Hugo Cantergiani Regional Airport , formerly called Campo dos Bugres Airport, is the airport serving Caxias do Sul, Brazil.
	
It is operated by the Municipality of Caxias do Sul.

History
Commissioned in March 1941, Caxias do Sul Airport has followed the evolution of aeronautics in the last eight decades. In addition to the runway, previously located in the current "Cinquentenário" neighborhood, the Caxias do Sul Aeroclube appeared in February of that year, with the objective of training pilots. The ceremony was attended by journalist Assis Chateaubriand, who launched the National Aviation Campaign, a project that provided tools for aviation schools.

According to researcher Roberto Grazziotin, the airport moved to "Salgado Filho" neighborhood in 1954.

In 1972, with the intention of welcoming President Médici, a 1,500-meter runway was paved. However, the strong momentum was triggered in 1987, when the airport improved and the State began the work of installing instruments and expanding the landing / takeoff runway from 1500 m to 2000 m, as well as the passenger terminal for the installation of the line. between Caxias / São Paulo.

Passengers used the 30-seat Brasilia plane from Rio-Sul, comparing flights scheduled between Monday and Friday.

The arrival of the Boeing 737-500 from Rio-Sul signaled the demand and a growing airport evolution in the municipality. In December 1993, tests were started with a modern aircraft to make the Caxias / Congonhas (SP) connection, with a stopover in Porto Alegre.

Gol Linhas Aéreas, which arrived at the Brazilian market with innovations and competitive prices, installed its services at the airport on October 27, 2004. At that time, the first flight with a Boeing 737-700 registered the arrival of 57 passengers and boarded 82 bound for São Paulo.

On November 10, 2011, Azul started offering services with daily lines to Curitiba and Campinas.

Previously operated by DAP with participation of the Municipality of Caxias do Sul, on August 26, 2022 the concession of the facility was transferred entirely to the Municipality.

Airlines and destinations

Passenger and Cargo Movement
Below is a summary of statistics related to the facility: 

Annual Passenger Traffic on Commercial Flights at Caxias do Sul Airport:

Access

See also

List of airports in Brazil

References

External links

Airports in Rio Grande do Sul
Airports established in 1988
Buildings and structures in Caxias do Sul